Rencheng is one of two districts and the seat of the city of Jining in Shandong province, China. In November 2013 Shizhong District was merged into Rencheng.

Administrative divisions
As 2013, this district is divided to 15 subdistricts and 5 townships.

Transportation
Jining railway station is located here.

References

County-level divisions of Shandong
Jining